Jaya Supermarket is a supermarket in Petaling Jaya, Selangor, Malaysia. Built in 1974, it was one of the first supermarkets in Petaling Jaya, and originally lasted until its deconstruction and subsequent accidental collapse in 2009. A new shopping complex was built on the same site, renamed to Jaya Shopping Centre.

The original building had four storeys of retail units, five storeys of office units and four storeys of car-parks. The building was earmarked for redevelopment, in which it would be demolished and rebuilt as a namesake shopping centre, with additional loading bays, access roads and security in the late 2000s.

Incidents

Car park controversy 
Jaya Supermarket was involved in a controversy in the early 1990s when it built its 10-storey car park extension – four storeys higher than the building plans approved by the then Petaling Jaya Municipal Council (MPPJ).

Collapse 
On 28 May 2009, Jaya Supermarket collapsed while being torn down for redevelopment, killing seven Indonesian laborers, and injuring an unspecified number of people in the busy commercial district. An investigative committee found that the deaths were due to mistakes in the demolition process, and made recommendations for improvements in Malaysia's regulations on demolition projects.

References

Further reading
 
 
 
 
 

Shopping malls in Selangor
Collapsed buildings and structures
Shopping malls established in 1974
Demolished buildings and structures in Malaysia